Valerie "Valli" Kafka Pollak (25 September 1890 in Prague – Fall of 1942 at Chełmno extermination camp) was the second oldest sister of Franz Kafka.

Life 
Valli Kafka attended the German Girls' School in Prague and later a private further educational instutuion for girls. Little is known about Kafka's relationship with Valli. Of all the siblings, she was supposedly the one who had the least trouble with her father, Hermann Kafka. Outwardly, she seemed discreet and adjusted, however she was well-read and inclined to language.

She married commercial employee Josef Pollak with whom she had two daughters, Marianne (1913–2000) and Lotte (1914–1931). She became one of the first woman teachers in the Prague Jewish School founded in 1920.

In late October 1941 Valli and her husband were deported to the Łódź Ghetto where they lived together temporarily with Valli's sister Elli and her daughter Hanna in the spring of 1942. Valerie Pollak was probably murdered in the fall of 1942 in the Chełmno extermination camp. Elli and the third sister Ottla as well as other relatives also became victims of the Holocaust. At the family grave in the New Jewish Cemetery in Prague, a plaque commemorates the three sisters.

Her first daughter Marianne emigrated to England along with her husband Georg Steiner in 1939. She looked after the inheritance of her uncle Franz Kafka in the Bodleian Library in the University of Oxford.

References

Bibliography

External links 

 Page of Fischer-Verlages about Valli Kafka
 Page about the daughter Marianne
 The Final Journey of Franz Kafka's Sisters

1890 births
People from Prague
1942 deaths
Franz Kafka
Austro-Hungarian Jews
People from the Kingdom of Bohemia
Łódź Ghetto inmates
Czech Jews who died in the Holocaust